The National Centre for Computing Education is a government-funded initiative, offering teacher training and resources for computer science.

Function
The National Centre for Computing Education provides training in computing education for primary and secondary schools and colleges, including face-to-face courses around England, and free online courses. It also offers a repository of teaching resources for computing through its website, teachcomputing.org. 
The NCCE programme is organised around a network of school-based Computing Hubs teachcomputing.org/hubs, geographically distributed around England. These Hubs ensure that the programme is school-led and reflects the needs of teachers on the ground.

History
The centre was set up following the January 2016 government report Digital Skills for the UK Economy  which highlighted the digital skills gap in the UK economy, produced by the Department for Business, Innovation and Skills (BIS), which looked at research carried out by the UK Commission for Employment and Skills (UKCES), which itself closed in 2017.

Funding of £84m was announced in the November 2017 United Kingdom budget to upskill around 8000 computer science teachers. Simon Peyton Jones FRS, of Microsoft Research, was appointed as the organisation's chairman in March 2019. It has been created by STEM Learning at the University of York, the BCS (British Computer Society) and the Raspberry Pi Foundation. 

It is funded by the Department for Education.

See also
 Micro Bit
 National Centre for Excellence in the Teaching of Mathematics in south Sheffield

References

2018 establishments in England
British Computer Society
Computer science education in the United Kingdom
Department for Education
Educational organisations based in England
Information technology organisations based in the United Kingdom
Organisations based in York
Research institutes in North Yorkshire
Science and technology in North Yorkshire
University of York